Ville Uusitalo (born July 6, 1979) is a Finnish former professional ice hockey defenceman.

Uusitalo played in Liiga for Jokerit, Pelicans and Ässät.

References

External links

1979 births
Living people
HC Alleghe players
Ässät players
Brest Albatros Hockey players
Finnish ice hockey defencemen
Jokerit players
Lahti Pelicans players
HC Salamat players
Sportspeople from Espoo